Thomas Lilley (December 19, 1887 – September 18, 1954) was an American long-distance runner. He competed in the marathon at the 1912 Summer Olympics.

References

External links
 

1887 births
1954 deaths
Athletes (track and field) at the 1912 Summer Olympics
American male long-distance runners
Olympic track and field athletes of the United States
Track and field athletes from Boston
American male marathon runners
20th-century American people